Joey Yung has won many awards throughout her singing career. She has been a regular winner at Hong Kong's four major music awards since her debut in 1999.

Significant awards

 10 JSG Most Popular Female Singer Awards (2003-2007, 2010-2014)
 9 Ultimate (Chik Chak) Female Singer Gold Awards (2003, 2005, 2007-2013)
 11 RTHK Best Female Pop Singer (2004-2014)
 9 Metro Female Singer Awards (2001-2009)
 7 IFPI Best Selling Female Singer (2004-2006, 2008, 2011, 2013-2014)
 2 JSG Asia Pacific Most Popular Hong Kong Female Singer Awards (2008, 2009)
 3 JSG Gold Song Gold for "我的驕傲" (2003) "搜神記" (2009) "天窗" (2013)
 1 RTHK Global Best Chinese Song Award for "我的驕傲" (2003)
 1 Metro Song of the Year for "我的驕傲" (2003)
 2 IFPI Best Selling Cantonese Album of the Year for "Love Joey" (2001), "Joey & Joey" (2011)
 3 Four Stations Media Award - Singer (2003, 2004, 2009)
 2 Four Stations Outstanding Performance Award (2000, 2001)

Award records

 Most Ultimate Female Singer Gold/Silver/Bronze wins (13, 2000-2012)
 Most Ultimate Female Singer Gold wins (8, 2003, 2005, 2007-2012)
 Most Consecutive Ultimate Female Singer Gold wins (6, 2007-2012)
 Most JSG Most Popular Female Singer wins (8, 2003–2007, 2012)
 Most Consecutive JSG Most Popular Female Singer wins (5, 2003-2007), tied with Anita Mui
 Most JSG awards won in one night (7 awards, 2009)
 Most Gold Song Gold wins by a female singer (2, 2003, 2009), tied with Sally Yeh and Miriam Yeung
 Most Metro Female Singer wins (9, 2001-2009)
 Youngest recipient of the Ultimate Female Singer Gold Award (23 years of age)
 Youngest recipient of the Ultimate My Most Favorite Female Singer (23 years of age)
 Most Media Award wins by a female artist (3, 2003, 2004, 2009), she is also the first solo female singer to win the award, as well as the first female singer to win the award without tying (Joey's first win was when she tied with Twins in 2003).

1999
Metro Hit Music Awards
Metro Best Newcomer
Metro Top 10 Hits: 未知
Ultimate Song Chart Awards
Ultimate Newcomer Bronze
Jade Solid Gold Top 10 Awards
Most Popular Newcomer Gold
Most Popular Cover Song: 未知
RTHK Top 10 Gold Songs Awards 
Best Newcomer Silver
Best Cover Song: 未知

2000
Metro Hit Music Awards
Metro Hit Song: 誰來愛我
Metro Hit Rising Female Singer
Ultimate Song Chart Awards
Ultimate Female Singer Bronze
Jade Solid Gold Top 10 Awards
Outstanding Performance Gold
Most Popular Commercial Song Silver:美麗在望
RTHK Top 10 Gold Songs Awards 
Top 10 Chinese Gold Songs: 誰來愛我
Most Improved Female Singer Bronze
Four Stations Joint Music Awards
Outstanding Performance Gold

2001
Metro Hit Music Awards
Metro Hit Song: 痛愛
Metro Hit Female Singer
Ultimate Song Chart Awards
Ultimate Female Singer Bronze
Jade Solid Gold Top 10 Awards
JSG Top 10 Songs: 痛愛
Most Popular Commercial Song Bronze: 全新暑假
RTHK Top 10 Gold Songs Awards 
Top 10 Chinese Gold Songs: 痛愛
Top 10 Pop Singers
Most Improved Female Singer Gold
Four Stations Joint Music Awards
Outstanding Performance Gold
IFPI
 Top Ten Best Selling Cantonese Albums: 喜歡祖兒
 Best Selling Album of the Year: 喜歡祖兒

2002
Metro Hit Music Awards
Metro Hit Song: 抱抱
Metro Hit Song: 爭氣
Metro Hit Female Singer
Ultimate Song Chart Awards
Ultimate Top 10 - 4th: 爭氣
Ultimate Female Singer Silver
Jade Solid Gold Top 10 Awards
JSG Top 10 Songs: 爭氣
Most Popular Commercial Song Silver: 爭氣
RTHK Top 10 Gold Songs Awards 
Top 10 Pop Singers
Top 10 Chinese Gold Songs: 爭氣
Best Selling Female Singer
IFPI Hong Kong Album Sales Awards
Top 10 Best Selling Cantonese Albums: 隆重登場
Top 10 Best Selling Cantonese Albums: 喜歡祖兒 2

2003
Metro Hit Music Awards
Metro Hit Song: 我的驕傲
Metro Hit Song of the Year: 我的驕傲
Metro Hit Female Singer: 我的驕傲
Ultimate Song Chart Awards
Ultimate Top 10 - 7th: 我的驕傲
Ultimate Female Singer Gold
Ultimate My Favourite Female Singer
Jade Solid Gold Top 10 Awards
JSG Top 10 Songs: 我的驕傲
Most Popular Female Singer
JSG Gold Song Gold: 我的驕傲
RTHK Top 10 Gold Songs Awards
Top 10 Pop Singers
Top 10 Chinese Gold Songs: 我的驕傲
Global Best Chinese Song: 我的驕傲
Best Selling Female Singer
 Four Stations Joint Music Awards
Media Award - Singer
IFPI Hong Kong Album Sales Awards
 Top 10 Best Selling Cantonese Albums: 我的驕傲
CASH Gold Sail Music Awards
 Best Female Vocal Performance: 爭氣

2004
Metro Hit Music Awards
Metro Hit Song: 一拍兩散
Metro Hit Song: 世上只有
Ultimate Song Chart Awards
Ultimate Top 10 - 9th: 一拍兩散
Ultimate Female Singer Silver
Ultimate My Favourite Female Singer
Jade Solid Gold Top 10 Awards
JSG Top 10 Songs: 世上只有
Most Popular Commercial Song Gold: 心病 
Most Popular Mandarin Song Silver: 獨照
Most Popular Female Singer
RTHK Top 10 Gold Songs Awards 
Top 10 Chinese Gold Songs: 世上只有
Top 10 Pop Singers
Best Selling Female Singer
Best Pop Female Singer
Four Stations Joint Music Awards
Media Award - Singer
IFPI Hong Kong Album Sales Awards
 Top 10 Best Selling Cantonese Albums: Nin9 2 5ive
 Top 10 Best Selling Cantonese Albums: Give Love A Break
 Top 10 Best Selling Cantonese Albums: Show Up! Live
 Top 10 Best Selling Mandarin Albums: 獨照
 Best Selling Local Female Artist

2005
Metro Hit Music Awards
Metro Hit Song: 明日恩典
Metro Original Song: 明日恩典
Global Stage Performance
Global Hit Song: 明日恩典
Metro Hit Female Singer
Metro Most Admired Female Singer
Metro Hit Asia Female Singer
Ultimate Song Chart Awards
Ultimate Female Singer Gold
Jade Solid Gold Top 10 Awards
JSG Top 10 Songs: 明日恩典
Most Popular Female Singer
RTHK Top 10 Gold Songs Awards 
Top 10 Pop Singers
Top 10 Chinese Gold Songs: 明日恩典
Best Pop Female Singer
Best Selling Female Singer
Nation's Popular Female Singer Gold
IFPI Hong Kong Album Sales Awards
Top 10 Best Selling Cantonese Albums: 喜歡祖兒 3
Top 10 Best Selling Cantonese Albums: Joey + Hacken Music is Live
Top 10 Best Selling Local Artists
Best Selling Local Female Artist

2006
Metro Hit Music Awards
Metro Hit Song: 華麗邂逅
Metro Hit Song: 赤地雪
Metro Hit Commercial Song: 華麗邂逅
Metro Global Stage Performance
Metro Hit Female Singer
Ultimate Song Chart Awards
Ultimate Top 10 - 3rd: 華麗邂逅
Ultimate Female Singer Silver
Jade Solid Gold Top 10 Awards
JSG Top Ten Songs: 華麗邂逅
Most Popular Commercial Song Bronze: 華麗邂逅
Most Popular Mandarin Song Bronze: 愛情复興
Most Popular Female Singer
RTHK Top 10 Gold Songs Awards 
Top 10 Pop Singers
Top 10 Chinese Gold Songs: 華麗邂逅
Best Pop Female Singer
Best Selling Female Singer
Nation's Most Popular Female Singer
IFPI Hong Kong Album Sales Awards
Top 10 Best Selling Local Artists
Top 10 Best Selling Cantonese Albums: One Live One Love
Top 10 Best Selling Cantonese Albums: Reflection of Joey's Live
Best Selling Local Female Artist

2007
Metro Hit Music Awards
Metro Hit Song: 零時零分
Metro Hit Female Singer
Nation's Fan Favourite Female Singer
Metro Global Hit Singer
Ultimate Song Chart Awards
Ultimate Top 10 - 7th: 愛一個上一課
Ultimate Female Singer Gold
Jade Solid Gold Top 10 Awards
JSG Top 10 Songs: 零時零分
Most Popular Commercial Song Gold: 心花怒放
Most Popular Mandarin Song Gold: 小小
Most Popular Female Singer
RTHK Top 10 Gold Songs Awards
Top 10 Pop Artist
Top 10 Chinese Gold Songs: 愛一個上一課
Best Pop Female Singer
Best Selling Female Singer
Nation's Best Female Singer
IFPI Hong Kong Album Sales Awards
Top 10 Best Selling Cantonese Albums: Leo + Joey Juicy Lemon Live
Top 10 Best Selling Mandarin Albums: 小小

2008
Metro Hit Music Awards
Metro Hit Song: 陪我長大
Metro Hit Female Singer
Metro Most Airplay Spins - Singer
Metro Global Hit Singer
Metro Global Stage Performance
Ultimate Song Chart Awards
Ultimate Top 10 - 4th: 跑步機上
Ultimate Female Singer Gold
Jade Solid Gold Top 10 Awards
JSG Top 10 Songs: 跑步機上
Most Popular Commercial Song: Lucky Star
Asia Pacific Most Popular Hong Kong Female Singer
RTHK Top 10 Gold Songs Awards 
Top 10 Pop Singers
Top 10 Chinese Gold Songs: 陪我長大
Nation's Best Female Singer
Best Selling Female Singer
Best Pop Female Singer
IFPI Hong Kong Album Sales Awards
Top 10 Best Selling Local Artists
Top 10 Best Selling Cantonese Albums: 喜歡祖兒 4
Top 10 Best Selling Cantonese Albums: StarLight Live
Best Selling Local Female Artist

2009
Metro Hit Music Awards
Metro Hit Song: 搜神記
Metro Hit Female Singer
Metro Most Airplay Spins - Singer
Metro Global Hit Singer
Metro Hit Mandarin Song: 祖國兒女
Metro Honorary Pop Queen Award
Ultimate Song Chart Awards
Ultimate Female Singer Gold
Jade Solid Gold Top 10 Awards
JSG Top Ten Songs: 搜神記
JSG Top Ten Songs: 可歌可泣
Most Popular Commercial Song: 雙冠軍
Most Popular Mandarin Song Silver: 這就是愛嗎
Most Popular Cover Song Silver: 開動快樂
Asia Pacific Most Popular Hong Kong Female Singer
JSG Gold Song Gold: 搜神記
RTHK Top 10 Gold Songs Awards 
Top 10 Pop Singers
Top 10 Chinese Gold Songs: 搜神記
Nation's Best Female Singer
Best Selling Female Singer
Best Pop Female Singer
Four Stations Joint Music Awards 
Media Award - Singer
IFPI Hong Kong Album Sales Awards
Top 10 Best Selling Local Artists
Top 10 Best Selling Cantonese Albums: A Time For Us
Top 10 Best Selling Mandarin Albums: 很忙
Best Selling Local Live Record Production: Joey Yung Perfect Ten Live
Best Selling Local Live Record Production: Joey Yung x Anthony Wong Metro Concert

2010
Metro Hit Music Awards
Metro Hit Song: 破相
Metro Most Admired Song: 破相
Metro Global Hit Stage Performer
Metro Global Hit Singer
Metro Hit Dancing Song: 桃色冒險
Ultimate Song Chart Awards
Ultimate Female Singer Gold
Ultimate Top 10 - 4th: 桃色冒險
Jade Solid Gold Top 10 Awards
JSG Top Ten Songs: 破相
Most Popular Commercial Song: 綠野仙蹤
Most Popular Mandarin Song Gold: 信今生愛過
Most Popular Female Singer
RTHK Top 10 Gold Songs Awards 
Top 10 Pop Singers
Top 10 Chinese Gold Songs: 破相
Best Pop Female Singer
IFPI Hong Kong Album Sales Awards
Top 10 Best Selling Local Artists
Top 10 Best Selling Cantonese Albums: Joey Ten EP 2010

References
 JSG Top Ten Awards Archives, Tvcity.tvb.com
 RTHK Top Ten Awards Archives

Yung, Joey
Cantopop